The Boyne Greenway or  Boyneside Trail is a greenway, cycle track and walkway along the Oldbridge section of the Boyne Navigation in Ireland. It runs from Pass, County Meath to opposite the entrance to the 'Battle of the Boyne' Visitor Centre. 

A seven kilometre continuation of the route, from Ship Street in Drogheda to Mornington, County Meath, along the Boyne Estuary was proposed in the early 21st century. As of December 2020, the proposal was awaiting a decision on planning permission.

A 26.5 kilometre extension towards Navan was also proposed. In February 2021, Meath County Council launched a public consultation on the potential route. The extension is proposed to run from Andy Brennan Park in Navan to the gates of the Oldbridge Estate.

References

External links
 Meath County Council - Boyne Cycleway (archived)

Irish Greenways
Transport in County Meath